Caridina nilotica is a species of freshwater shrimp in the family Atyidae. It is native to Africa from the River Nile in Egypt to Lake Sibaya, South Africa, and is the only species of shrimp in Lake Victoria.

References

External links

Atyidae
Freshwater crustaceans of Africa
Crustaceans described in 1833